One Long Winter Without Fire is a 2004 Swiss drama film directed by Greg Zgliński.

Cast 
 Aurélien Recoing - Jean
 Marie Matheron - Laure
 Gabriela Muskala - Labinota
 Blerim Gjoci - Kastriot

External links 

2004 drama films
2004 films
Swiss drama films
2000s French-language films
French-language Swiss films